Jack Boyle (1866–1913) was an American catcher and first baseman in Major League Baseball.

Jack Boyle may also refer to:
 Jack Boyle (academic administrator) (born 1941), former vice-president of Cleveland State
 Jack Boyle (cricketer) (born 1996), New Zealand cricketer
 Jack Boyle (footballer) (born 1990), footballer from Jersey
 Jack Boyle (third baseman) (1889–1971), Major League Baseball third baseman
 Captain Jack Boyle, a character in the 1924 Seán O'Casey play Juno and the Paycock
 Jack Boyle, author of the 1914 to 1920 Boston Blackie stories
 Jack Boyle, a character in the American television series Blue Bloods

See also
 John Boyle (disambiguation)
 Jack Doyle (disambiguation)